Halifax Island is a small rocky island about  from the mainland, near Lüderitz in Namibia. It is the third most important breeding site for African penguins in Namibia.

History

Captain Charles C. Forsyth of the Cape of Good Hope Station was ordered to take possession of the Penguin Islands and the Lüderitz Bay. Captain Forsyth proclaimed British sovereignty over the islands on 5 May 1866. Philip Edmond Wodehouse leased the Penguin islands in 1867 to De Pass, Spence & Co. and Robert Granger until 1895. They were given exclusive rights to mine guano and hunt seals.

The penguin population in the island has halved in the 30 years between 1970 and 2000. Houses and sheds used by guano miners and the local headman are currently in various stages of deterioration. The uninhabited buildings are now used by penguins for breeding. The Namibian Government's Ministry of Fisheries and Marine Resources currently manages the island and monitors the seabird population.

Location

The island is serviced by a catamaran tour from Lüderitz. The island itself is out of bounds for the public, even though the catamarans are allowed to sail past the island to offer a view of the penguins.

Fauna
The island is also home to colonies of Kelp gulls, with around 350 nests recorded in the summer of 2000. Their numbers are bolstered by the nearby dump in Lüderitz. Increase in gull population has been problematic to penguin eggs which are eaten by the gulls. Crowned cormorant, Greater crested tern and Hartlaub's gull are also found to breed in the island. A pilot project in May 2001 led to three African oystercatcher fledgling successfully in the island. Cape cormorant and White-breasted cormorant are also observed to roost on the island. Cape wagtail, Turnstone, Greater flamingo and Whimbrel have also been sighted in the island. Heaviside's dolphin are also occasionally spotted in the bay. Brown fur seal also come over to hunt the penguins.

References

Lüderitz
Geography of ǁKaras Region
Islands of Namibia
Nature conservation in Namibia